The Grass Mountain Chateau is a former residence of late President of the Republic of China Chiang Kai-shek located in Beitou District, Taipei, Taiwan in Yangmingshan National Park.

History

Empire of Japan
The Grass Mountain Chateau, a building surrounded by a partially landscaped  site, was built by Taiwan Sugar Corporation in 1920. The chateau served as a recreational facility for employees and hosted Japanese royalty. Emperor Hirohito of Japan personally visited the residence and stayed there for 1 hour and 50 minutes, according to historical records.

Republic of China / Taiwan
When in 1949 the Republic of China government fled from Nanking to Taipei in Taiwan, Kuomintang leader Chiang Kai-shek claimed the chateau as his first official residence. The site served as Chiang's main residence for a year until a mansion closer to central Taipei could be completed. After the shift of Taiwan society to modern democracy in the 1990s, the chateau and its grounds served as both a historical museum and an art exhibition center, both of which are open to the public. 

On April 7, 2001 at around 12:22 AM a large fire engulfed the main halls of the chateau. The Yangmingshan Fire Department had to call in other engines nearby Shilin and Shipai. The fire was put under control at around 1:20 AM but caused widespread damage. Taipei City officials reported the cause as arson, but stopped short of speculating that the motive may have been political. Three days later the Taipei City Department of Cultural Affairs announced that the site would be restored at a cost of $US900,000. On December 29, 2011, the chateau reopened.

See also
 Guesthouses of Chiang Kai-shek
 Seven Seas Residence

References

External link

1920 establishments in Taiwan
Historic sites in Taiwan
Buildings and structures in Taipei
Presidential residences in Taiwan